Eranad Taluk comes under Perinthalmanna revenue division in Malappuram district of Kerala, India. Its headquarters is the city of Manjeri. Eranad Taluk contains two municipalities - Manjeri and Malappuram. Most of the administrative offices are located in the Civil Station at Malappuram and the Mini-Civil Station at Manjeri.

History

Eranad was the largest taluk in the erstwhile Malabar District in terms of area. After the formation of Kerala state, it continued to be largest taluk in the state, until the formation of Nilambur Taluk in 1990s. At that time the taluk had 6 Revenue blocks in it: Malappuram, Manjeri, Kondotty, Wandoor, Vengara, and Tirurangadi. On 1st November 1957, the Revenue blocks of Vengara, and Tirurangadi, were added to the newly formed Tirur Taluk. In the 1990s a major portion of Wandoor Revenue Block was separated to form Nilambur Taluk. In 2013, Kondotty Taluk was formed by taking some villages from Eranad Taluk.

Now, Eranad Taluk has 23 villages.

Villages
Eranad (Manjeri) taluk contains the following villages.

 Malappuram
 Panakkad
 Melmuri
 Payyanad
 Elankur
 Karakunnu
 Trikkalangode
 Kavanoor
 Areekode
 Vettilappara
 Urangattiri
 Kizhuparamba
 Pulpatta
 Narukara
 Perakamanna
 Pookkottur
 Vettikattiri
 Pandikkad
 Chembrasseri
 Anakkayam
 Panthalloor
 Edavanna
 Manjeri

Taluks of Malappuram

See also  
 Eranad
 List of villages in Malappuram district
 List of Gram Panchayats in Malappuram district
 List of desoms in Malappuram district (1981)
 Revenue Divisions of Kerala

References 

Taluks of Kerala